A total lunar eclipse took place on May 4, 2004, the first of two total lunar eclipses in 2004, the second being on October 28, 2004.

Visibility 

It was visible throughout most of Europe and Asia, eastern Africa, Indian Ocean and western South America including the Pacific Ocean. The eclipse seen in eastern Asia before sunrise and western South America after sunset. The eclipse was seen over and the Philippines at dawn. Mid Eclipse was visible during moonset in Eastern Australia.

Related lunar eclipses

Eclipse season 

This is the second eclipse this season.

First eclipse this season: 19 April 2004 Partial Solar Eclipse

Eclipses of 2004 

 A partial solar eclipse on April 19.
 A total lunar eclipse on May 4.
 A partial solar eclipse on October 14.
 A total lunar eclipse on October 28.

Lunar year series 
It is the third of four lunar year cycles, repeating every 354 days.

Saros series

Metonic series

Tritos series 
 Preceded: Lunar eclipse of June 4, 1993

 Followed: Lunar eclipse of April 5, 2015

Tzolkinex 
 Preceded: Lunar eclipse of March 24, 1997

 Followed: Lunar eclipse of June 15, 2011

Half-Saros cycle
A lunar eclipse will be preceded and followed by solar eclipses by 9 years and 5.5 days (a half saros). This lunar eclipse is related to two annular solar eclipses of Solar Saros 138.

See also 
List of lunar eclipses and List of 21st-century lunar eclipses
May 2003 lunar eclipse
November 2003 lunar eclipse
October 2004 lunar eclipse

Notes

External links
 NASA
 
  APOD 2004 May 6, A Lunar Eclipse Mosaic, from Greece
 APOD 2004 May 8, Good Morning Sydney, Sydney Australia
 Photos 
 Spaceweather.com: Lunar eclipse gallery

2004-05
2004 in science
May 2004 events